Tommy Plommer (born August 26, 1968) is a retired professional ice hockey player who holds dual Canadian and British nationality. He played for the Ayr Raiders in 1991–92, the Sheffield Steelers between 1992 and 2000 and the Hull Thunder in 2000–01. He was also a member of the Great Britain national ice hockey team at the 1994 Pool B World Championships.

External links

1968 births
Living people
British ice hockey players
Canadian ice hockey right wingers
Hull Thunder players
Ice hockey people from Ontario
Sheffield Steelers players
Canadian expatriate ice hockey players in England